The bill , long title "To authorize the Secretary of Transportation to obligate funds for emergency relief projects arising from damage caused by severe weather events in 2013, and for other purposes," is a bill that was introduced in the United States House of Representatives during the 113th United States Congress.   The bill would allow the United States Department of Transportation to "exceed a $100 million cap on grants to repair roads damaged by a national emergency."  The bill was written in response to the 2013 Colorado floods, which caused as much as $500 million worth of damage to Colorado's roads.

Background

The 2013 Colorado floods were a natural disaster that occurred in the U.S. state of Colorado. During the week starting on September 9, 2013, a slow-moving cold front stalled over Colorado, clashing with warm humid monsoonal air from the south. This resulted in heavy rain and catastrophic flooding along Colorado's Front Range from Colorado Springs north to Fort Collins. The situation intensified on September 11 and 12.

The flood waters spread across a range of almost  from north to south, affecting 17 counties. Governor John Hickenlooper declared a disaster emergency on September 13, 2013, in 14 counties: Adams, Arapahoe, Broomfield, Boulder, Denver, El Paso, Fremont, Jefferson, Larimer, Logan, Morgan, Pueblo, Washington and Weld. By September 15, federal emergency declarations covered those 14 counties as well as Clear Creek County.

Provisions of the bill

H.R. 3174 would exempt Colorado from a cap on funding, contained in Division A of Public Law 113-2 (The Disaster Relief Appropriations Act, 2013), from the Federal Aid Highways Emergency Relief program of $100 million per emergency incident. Under the bill, the Congressional Budget Office (CBO) estimates that $300 million of funds made available for the Emergency Relief Program in Public Law 113-2 would be used in Colorado to repair roads damaged by flooding in 2013. The CBO estimates that by using those funds in Colorado in fiscal year 2014 instead of on emergency repair projects in other states in future years, the pace of spending of that money would be slightly faster over the 2014-2015 period but slower in later years and thus result in no net change in direct spending over the 2014-2023 period.

Procedural history

House
H.R. 3174 was introduced in the House on September 25, 2013 by Rep. Cory Gardner (R-CO).  It was referred to the United States House Committee on Transportation and Infrastructure.  On September 30, 2013, newspaper The Hill reported that the House was expected to consider H.R. 3174 under a suspension of the rules later that day.  The bill passed by voice vote on September 30, 2013.

Debate and discussion
When arguing in favor of the bill, Rep. Cory Gardner cited the statistics that the flood effected "two hundred mile lines of highway."  The fact that a similar bill had been sponsored by Colorado's senators in the Senate was considered "an indication that the bill has a good chance of passing in the Senate."

See also
List of bills in the 113th United States Congress
2013 Colorado floods
Disaster Relief Appropriations Act, 2013

Notes and references

External links

Library of Congress - Thomas H.R. 3174
beta.congress.gov H.R. 3174
GovTrack.us H.R. 3174
OpenCongress.org H.R. 3174
WashingtonWatch.com H.R. 3174
House Republican Conference's legislative digest on H.R. 3174
Congressional Budget Office's report on H.R. 3174

Disaster preparedness in the United States